Eupropacris abbreviata, commonly known as the Kilosa Noble Grasshopper, is a species of grasshopper of the family Acrididae. The species is endemic to Kilosa, Tanzania, and is Critically endangered due to deforestation.

References

Insects described in 1929
Acrididae
Endemic fauna of Tanzania